Ibapah is a small unincorporated community in far western Tooele County, Utah, United States, near the Nevada state line.

Description

The settlement is located near the Deep Creek Mountains. The site was originally established in 1859 by Mormon missionaries sent to teach the local Native Americans farming methods. A Pony Express station operated here in 1860 and 1861, and the town was on an early alignment of the Lincoln Highway. A post office operated here from 1883 to 1980. Ibapah is currently inhabited mostly by Goshute people, with scattered farmlands and a trading post belonging to more recent settlers. The community is the headquarters of the Confederated Tribes of the Goshute Reservation, a federally recognized tribe.

Originally named Deep Creek for a creek of the same name in the area, the name was later changed to Ibapah, an anglicized form of the Goshute word Ai-bim-pa or Ai'bĭm-pa which means "White Clay Water".

The town is isolated and is usually reached by going out of Utah into Nevada and back into Utah.

Climate
The climate is typical of that of a high elevation Great Basin location, being semi-arid and featuring, in consequence, large differences in temperature between day and night.

See also

References

External links

Unincorporated communities in Tooele County, Utah
Unincorporated communities in Utah
Populated places established in 1859
Pony Express stations
Goshute
1859 establishments in Utah Territory